Ōsumi (or Ohsumi, おおすみ) was the first Japanese satellite put into orbit. It was launched on February 11, 1970 at 04:25 UTC with a Lambda 4S-5 rocket from Uchinoura Space Center by Institute of Space and Aeronautical Science, University of Tokyo, now part of the Japan Aerospace Exploration Agency (JAXA). Japan became the fourth nation after the USSR, United States and France to release an artificial satellite into successful orbit on its own. The satellite was named after the Ōsumi Peninsula in Kagoshima Prefecture, Japan, where the launch site was located.

See also
 Timeline of artificial satellites and space probes

References

External links 

 Kiwi-Osumi-image

Satellites formerly orbiting Earth
Satellites of Japan
First artificial satellites of a country
Spacecraft launched in 1970